Santiago Tenango is a town and municipality in Oaxaca in south-western Mexico. The municipality covers an area of 196.48 km², and is part of the Etla District in the Valles Centrales region.

Population 
As of 2005, the municipality had a total population of 1,782.

References

Municipalities of Oaxaca